Pereyaslavl can refer to:

 Pereslavl-Zalessky, a town in the Yaroslavl Oblast in Russia, called Pereyaslavl until the 15th century
 Pereyaslavl Ryazansky, renamed Ryazan in 1778
 Pereiaslav, a town in Kyiv Oblast in Ukraine (was Pereiaslav-Khmelnytskyi in 1943-2019); historically, also called Pereyaslavl Russkiy and Pereyaslavl Yuzhniy
 Principality of Pereslavl or Pereyaslavl, a medieval Eastern Slavic state of the Rus from 1175 to 1302

ru:Переяслав